Madam Lucy Gulama (born 26 September 1896 - 1966) was the wife of Sierra Leonean Paramount Chief Julius Gulama.

Madam Lucy was the matriarch of one of Sierra Leone's most powerful noble families. She is the mother of Paramount Chief Madam Ella Koblo Gulama and Komeh Gulama Lansana, the widow of Brigadier David Lansana, the late Commander of Sierra Leone's Armed Forces who briefly served as a military junta leader before his removal and subsequent execution after a counter coup in 1975.

Her husband Julius Gulama was Paramount Chief of Kaiyamba Chiefdom. He was a beloved and revered figure in Sierra Leone, who is remembered for his efforts to unite the country's various ethnic groups together. He was a passionate advocate of education in Sierra Leone.

References

External links
The life and Times of Honourable PC Madam Ella Koblo Gulama of Sierra Leone By Awareness Times, September 26, 2006
Tribute to the Honourable PC Ella Koblo Gulama, Sierra Connection
Women Leaders In Africa
No Contender against Margai in Sierra Leone

1921 births
African royalty
People from Moyamba District
Sierra Leonean nobility
Sierra Leonean royalty
1966 deaths